Diaková is a village and municipality in Martin District in the Žilina Region of northern Slovakia. Coordinates: latitude: 49° 2' 60"N, longitude: 18° 58' 0"E.

History
In historical records the village was first mentioned in 1327.

Geography
The municipality lies at an altitude of 420 metres and covers an area of 2.421 km2. It has a population of about 457 people.

Genealogical resources

The records for genealogical research are available at the state archive "Statny Archiv in Bytca, Slovakia"

 Lutheran church records (births/marriages/deaths): 1784-1904 (parish B)

References

See also

 Đakovica in Kosovo (It was once called Diakovitza or Diakova)
 List of municipalities and towns in Slovakia

External links
https://web.archive.org/web/20071116010355/http://www.statistics.sk/mosmis/eng/run.html
Surnames of living people in Diakova

Villages and municipalities in Martin District